In 1953, the United States FBI, under Director J. Edgar Hoover, continued for a fourth year to maintain a public list of the people it regarded as the Ten Most Wanted Fugitives.

1953 was a very productive year for the FBI, as the Bureau listed and then also soon caught many fugitives.  At the rate of two fugitives per month, 1953 long held the early record (surpassed in 1968) for the most top ten fugitives listed in a single year, numbering 24 in total.

1953 fugitives
The "Ten Most Wanted Fugitives" listed by the FBI in 1953 include (in FBI list appearance sequence order):

Charles Patrick Shue
January 15, 1953 #41
One month on the list
Charles Patrick Shue - U.S. prisoner arrested February 13, 1953, in Los Angeles, California, as a result of the FBI being notified after an individual recognized Shue's picture in a newspaper

Lawson David Shirk Butler
January 22, 1953 #42
Three months on the list
Lawson David Shirk Butler - U.S. prisoner arrested April 21, 1953, in Los Angeles, California

Joseph James Brletic
February 8, 1953 #43
Two days on the list
Joseph James Brletic - U.S. prisoner arrested February 10, 1953, in Lancaster, California, by the Los Angeles Sheriff's office after being recognized from a photograph in the Los Angeles Herald-Express newspaper

David Dallas Taylor
March 3, 1953 #44
Three months on the list
David Dallas Taylor - U.S. prisoner arrested May 26, 1953, in Chicago, Illinois

Perlie Miller
March 4, 1953 #45
One day on the list
Perlie Miller - U.S. prisoner arrested March 5, 1953, while working at a local diner, when a customer recognized him from a published "Top Ten" photograph, in Somersworth, New Hampshire

Fred William Bowerman
March 5, 1953 #46
Two months on the list
Fred William Bowerman - deceased, was mortally wounded April 24, 1953, by police officers while attempting to flee
the scene of a bank robbery in St. Louis, Missouri

Robert Benton Mathus
March 16, 1953 #47
Three days on the list
Robert Benton Mathus - U.S. prisoner arrested March 19, 1953, in Duson, Louisiana, by the FBI and local police after
being recognized by a citizen from a wanted flyer

Floyd Allen Hill
March 30, 1953 #48
Three weeks on the list
Floyd Allen Hill - U.S. prisoner arrested April 18, 1953, in Dallas, Texas

Joseph Levy
May 1, 1953 #49
Caught before publication
Joseph Levy (fugitive) - U.S. prisoner apprehended April 30, 1953, in Louisville, Kentucky, by FBI Agents who recognized him from the "Top Ten" material sent to the field office one day prior to the public announcement of the list.

Arnold Hinson
May 4, 1953 #50
Six months on the list
Arnold Hinson - U.S. prisoner apprehended November 7, 1953, by Special Agents in the downtown area of Memphis, Tennessee

Gordon Lee Cooper
May 11, 1953 #51
One month on the list
Gordon Lee Cooper - U.S. prisoner arrested June 11, 1953, in St. Louis, Missouri, on a citizen tip when he was recognized from newspaper publicity

Fleet Robert Current
May 18, 1953 #52
Two months on the list
Fleet Robert Current - U.S. prisoner arrested July 12, 1953, on an Omaha, Nebraska, street corner

Donald Charles Fitterer
June 8, 1953 #53
Two weeks on the list
Donald Charles Fitterer - U.S. prisoner arrested June 21, 1953, in Oakland, California, by FBI and California State Patrol when a citizen had reported him to FBI Headquarters after recognizing him from a True Detective radio broadcast

John Raleigh Cooke
June 22, 1953 #54
Four months on the list
John Raleigh Cooke - U.S. prisoner arrested October 20, 1953, in Detroit, Michigan, as he descended for lunch from a roof
on a construction project where he was working as a welder. Upon arrest, Cooke stated it was a relief to be caught as he knew from newspaper articles he was on the FBI's list of Ten Most Wanted Fugitives and distance would not aid him in his flight.

Jack Gordon White
July 6, 1953 #55
Two months on the list
Jack Gordon White - U.S. prisoner apprehended August 27, 1953, during a traffic stop made without incident in downtown Seattle, Washington, when a police officer recognized him from an Identification Order, and then FBI and police determined the make of the vehicle he was driving, and were able to locate him

Alex Richard Bryant
July 14, 1953 #56
Seven months on the list
Alex Richard Bryant - U.S. prisoner arrested January 26, 1954, in Los Angeles, California

George William Krendich
July 22, 1953 #57
Three months on the list
George William Krendich - SUICIDE found October 11, 1953, in an abandoned Jeep in a lonely wooded area of Dunn County, North Dakota;  from asphyxiation of carbon monoxide fumes piped from the exhaust into the closed Jeep

Lloyd Reed Russell
September 8, 1953 #58
One year on the list
Lloyd Reed Russell - KILLED in a gun battle with local police officers August 3, 1954, in Spokane, Washington

Edwin Sanford Garrison
October 26, 1953 #59
One week on the list, was also Fugitive #112 in 1959
Edwin Sanford Garrison - later also became Fugitive #112 in 1959; U.S. prisoner arrested November 3, 1953, in Detroit, Michigan, without incident following citizen
recognition of Garrison from a newspaper photograph

Franklin James Wilson
November 2, 1953 #60
Three months on the list
Franklin James Wilson - U.S. prisoner arrested January 18, 1954, in Chicago, Illinois, after which in an interview Wilson decried the notoriety surrounding his addition to the list and blamed the extensive publicity for his early capture

Charles E. Johnson
November 12, 1953 #61
One month on the list
Charles E. Johnson - U.S. prisoner apprehended December 28, 1953, in Central Islip, Long Island, New York, after a citizen recognized him from a magazine article in the November 14, 1953, issue of the Saturday Evening Post

Thomas Jackson Massingale
November 18, 1953 #62
Eight days on the list
Thomas Jackson Massingale - U.S. prisoner apprehended November 26, 1953, in Las Vegas, New Mexico, after a citizen recognized him from a photograph in the November 24, 1953, issue of the Saturday Evening Post

Peter Edward Kenzik
December 7, 1953 #63
One year on the list
Peter Edward Kenzik - U.S. prisoner arrested January 26, 1955, in San Diego, California, for drunkenness, with a gun 
found in his possession, and identified by a routine fingerprint check

Thomas Everett Dickerson
December 10, 1953 #64
Two weeks on the list
Thomas Everett Dickerson - U.S. prisoner arrested December 21, 1953, in Verdunville, West Virginia, by FBI and the West Virginia State Patrol

Later entries
FBI Ten Most Wanted Fugitives, 2020s
FBI Ten Most Wanted Fugitives, 2010s
FBI Ten Most Wanted Fugitives, 2000s
FBI Ten Most Wanted Fugitives, 1990s
FBI Ten Most Wanted Fugitives, 1980s
FBI Ten Most Wanted Fugitives, 1970s
FBI Ten Most Wanted Fugitives, 1960s
FBI Ten Most Wanted Fugitives, 1950s

External links
Current FBI top ten most wanted fugitives at FBI site
FBI pdf source document listing all Ten Most Wanted year by year (removed by FBI)

1953 in the United States